The Punta Pioda (or Pioda di Sciora) is a  mountain in the Bregaglia Range of the Alps, located south of Vicosoprano in the canton of Graubünden. It lies in the Sciora group.

References

External links
Punta Pioda on Hikr
The Sciora group on Summitpost.org

Mountains of the Alps
Alpine three-thousanders
Mountains of Switzerland
Mountains of Graubünden
Bregaglia